A lithium atom is an atom of the chemical element lithium. Stable lithium is composed of three electrons bound by the electromagnetic force to a nucleus containing three protons along with either three or four neutrons, depending on the isotope, held together by the strong force. Similarly to the case of the helium atom, a closed-form solution to the Schrödinger equation for the lithium atom has not been found. However, various approximations, such as the Hartree–Fock method, can be used to estimate the ground state energy and wavefunction of the atom. The quantum defect is a value that describes the deviation from hydrogenic energy levels.

Further reading
W. Zheng et al. / Appl. Math. Comput. 153 (2004) 685–695 "Numerical solutions of the Schrödinger equation for the ground lithium by the finite element method"

Atoms
Lithium